Mohammed Yaqoub (Arabic:محمد يعقوب) (born 8 June 1989) is an Emirati footballer. He currently plays as a right back for Dibba.

Career
He formerly played for Ajman, Al-Wasl, and Dibba.

External links

References

1989 births
Living people
Emirati footballers
Ajman Club players
Al-Wasl F.C. players
Dibba FC players
UAE Pro League players
UAE First Division League players
Association football fullbacks
Place of birth missing (living people)